Lužnica may refer to:

 Lužnica, Croatia, a village in Croatia, in Zaprešić Municipality
 Lužnica, Visoko, a village in Bosnia and Herzegovina, in Visoko Municipality, Federation of Bosnia and Herzegovina
 , a village in Montenegro, in Podgorica Municipality
 , a village in Kosovo, in Suva Reka Municipality
 Lužnica (region), region in Serbia
 , river in Serbia, tributary of Vlasina
 , river in Serbia, tributary of Skrapež